Deborah Corum is the current director of athletics for Southern Utah University. She previously served as assistant athletic director for Stanford University from 1994 to 1996, as an associate athletic director at Louisiana State University from 1996 to 2000, as an associate athletic director at the University of Connecticut from 2012 to 2016, and as associate commissioner of the Southeastern Conference from 2000 to 2012. Corum graduated from Vanderbilt University with a bachelor's degree. Corum was named interim athletic director at Southern Utah University on June 20, 2017, then was promoted to the job on a permanent basis on November 30, 2017.

References

External links
 
Southern Utah Thunderbirds bio

Living people
Vanderbilt University alumni
Southern Utah Thunderbirds athletic directors
Women college athletic directors in the United States
Year of birth missing (living people)